Kurin' are fraternities within the Ukrainian Plast Scouting organization.

Lisovi Chorty

Lisovi Chorty (Ukrainian Лісові Чорти, English Forest Devils) - 3rd Kurin’ (fraternity) for Starshi Plastuny (Rover Scouts) and Senior Scouts in Plast - National Scouting Organization of Ukraine.

Lisovi Chorty known fully as Velyke Plemya Lisovykh Chortiv ("The Great Tribe of Forest Devils") was founded by a troop of Scouts from Lviv, Ukraine in 1922.  The official date of founding is July 22, 1922.

Historically, the Plast fraternity "Lisovi Chorty", as Plast itself, was established on the principles of Scouting, and from its founding to the time that Ukrainian Scouting was banned by the Polish government in 1930 which led to the "underground" Scouting movement, "Lisovi Chorty" were active in political and civil organizations, as well as military service.

"Lisovi Chorty" members took an active role in the attempt to gain Ukrainian independence during the second world war. They subsequently migrated to countries that welcomed the large Ukrainian diaspora : Australia, Argentina, England, United States of America, Canada, France and Germany. There "Lisovi Chorty" undertook to
community and Plast work, ensuring a viable organization for future generations of Plastuny (Ukrainian Scouts) in the diaspora. After the breakup of the Soviet Union and the formation of an independent Ukraine, there was a rebirth of Plast in Ukraine and the fraternity "Lisovi Chorty" reestablished in the cities of Lviv, Kyiv, Ivano-Frankivsk, as well as others.

Today, "Lisovi Chorty" have established sections in Australia, United States, Canada, Argentina, Ireland and Ukraine as well as a number of members in other countries.  Among the most famous members are UPA General Roman Shukhevych, politician Andriy Pyaseckyy, economist Bohdan Hawrylyshyn, last president of UNR in exile Mykola Plavyuk, writer Vasyl Karkhut, Bishop Hlib Lonchyna, and civil and political figure Stepan Okhrymovych.

Order of the Iron Spur

Order of the Iron Spur (in Ukrainian, Орден Залізної Остроги) is a male troop of the Ukrainian Plast Scouting organization.  It is sequentially the 15th kurin' (troop) of 'Rover Scouts' ("starshi plastuny").

History
It was founded as Order of the Iron Spur Chivalry in November 1916 by group of Ukrainian Sich Riflemen leading by centurion Ivan Tsiapka (who became the first Grand Komtur thereafter), although the factual initiator is considered to be Leo Lepky. The Chivalry was dissolved and afterwards revived by scouts (who were considered by former Order members to be their successors) in 1927 as a part of Plast organization. 
The aim of the modern Order, revived in 1996, is to develop Plast organization structure and Plast specializations as well as to promote the healthy lifestyle amongst Plast members.

Insignia of the Order
The composition base is the emblem of Sviatoslav the Conqueror ("bidental") - comes from the spur sign, the symbol of Ukrainian chivalry of princely times. Bidental of Svyatoslav, like a cross or a trident, is the symbol of the main principles of world growth, the combination of the two main life-giving principles (spirit and matter, fire and water, male and female).

The Will of Sviatoslav the Conqueror
Folk legends preserved the tale about Sviatoslav the Conqueror, who was about to go in the campaign against the Bulgarians. Once during the campaign his faithful horse had suddenly stopped and Sviatoslav refused to go into battle: magi believed if the horse resists to go in the campaign – it is a sign that the soldier would not return alive from the battlefield and predicted a death to the Grand prince. Smith Hysch  promised to invent for him a tool that will force a horse to go in the campaign. The Glorious blacksmith forged for Svyatoslav the first pair of iron spurs. The horse went on a campaign and Svyatoslav returned with a victory and glory. Then the prince thanked Hysch and gave him a will to found the Ruthenian Order of Knights in honor of the Iron Spures. 
Ivan Tsiapka, the future Grand Komtur of the Order, had seen a dream about that and decided to implement the Will of Sviatoslav.

Orden Khrestonistsiv

Orden Khrestonistsiv (in Ukrainian, Орден Хрестоносцiв) is a male fraternity of the Ukrainian Plast Scouting organization.  It is sequentially the 5th kurin' (fraternity) of 'Older Scouts' ("starshi plastuny") and the 20th kurin' of 'Senior Scouts' ("seniory").  Together, these two "kureny" form the Orden Khrestonostsiv (or the "Order of the Crusaders")

History

The Orden was founded by 16 plastuny aged 18 to 25, in March 1946, in the town of Traunstein in Bavaria, Germany. These plastuny (Ukrainian Scouts) were post-World War II displaced persons from what today is Western Ukraine.  Most of them were aged 18 through 20, and either in or entering universities and seminaries.

In 1948, the Orden had spread to include Scouts in the United States, Canada, France and Belgium.

Today, members can also be found in Argentina, Australia, Japan and, since 2002, again in Ukraine.

Structure and organization

The Orden consists of:
 The 5th Kurin of "starshi plastuny" (Older Scouts) and
 The 20th Kurin of "plastuny seniory" (Senior Scouts).

Each of the Kureni has a leadership that is led by a "Mayster," (master) with a "Skriptor" (scribe) and a "Trezoriy" (Treasurer).  Additional functions such as a "Iudex" (magistrate) and a "Prokurator" (procurer, responsible for attracting new converts).

Together, these two "kureny" form the "Orden."  The "Orden" has its own leadership that is led by the "Velykiy Mayster" (Grand Master), a "Velikiy Skriptor" (grand scribe), a "Velikiy Trezoriy" (grand treasurer).  There are additional posts of "Heral'dist" (herald, or archivist) and "Tseremoniyalmayster" (master of ceremonies and traditions).

Throughout the year, the activities of the members of both "kureny" are conducted both individually and through local chapters or "stezhi," which combine members of both kureny.  There are, or have been, "stezhi" in Chicago, Illinois; Buffalo, New York; New York City, New York; Jersey City, New Jersey; Philadelphia, Pennsylvania; Ternopil', Ukraine, among others.

Every two years, both kureni of the Orden meet at a "Velyka Rada" and elect new leadership of each "kurin'" and of the Orden itself..  The first Rada was held in Traunstein, Germany.  With the growth of the Orden in the United States, most "Rady" have been held in various US and Canadian locations (including East Chatham, New York; Parma, Ohio; Chicago, Illinois; Buffalo, New York; Fox Chase, Pennsylvania; Princeton, New Jersey; and Lviv, Ukraine).  In the 21st century, with the formation of OX "stezhi" in Ukraine, a "Rada" may open in one city in one continent, be suspended and then resume in another city and continent.

In intermediate years, each kurin' of the Orden has a "Mala Rada" ... today, with the "Senior Scouts" being more numerous than the "Older Scouts," a "Mala Rada" often includes members of both organizations.

In addition to the formal "rady" and local activity in the "stezhi," there are also informal and sporadic "Reydy" (raids) that are organized around the world.

Ranks and titles

The Orden is a fairly egalitarian organization, with only three basic levels of membership:

 "Kandydaty" or "Damski Kavalyery" are candidates for membership and, upon submission of an application for membership, are allowed to wear an emblem consisting of the black-and-white shield.
 "Aspiranty" have been affiliated with the kurin sufficiently to be steeped in the kurin's traditions, and have proven their mettle through a series of secret ordeals, and are allowed nearly all privileges of membership.  They wear an emblem (vidznaka) that consists of the entire OX symbol including the letters "OX," the shield, sword and a globe, albeit without the knight.
 "Lytsari" (or "Knights") are full members of the Orden, and have proven their worth by their deeds and actions over a period of at least two years of being "aspiranty."  They are knighted in a ceremony called "pasuvannia" and given their knightly name ("psevdo").  Henceforth, they are known to all members of the Orden as "Lytsar <name>."  All Lytsari have the same privileges, but historical seniority and tradition segregates them into "Older Lytsari" and "Younger Lytsari."

At formal gatherings, all members are aligned according to rank and, within rank, in the order of their knighthood or entry into the Orden.

Traditions

The Orden is rich in traditions and ceremonies.  Many of these are secret rituals including the mysterious "kanapa" and the spiritual "pasuvannia" and the arcane "kleynody" and are not disclosed to non-initiates.

Anthem

The "Hymn Khrestonostsiv" is solemnly intoned by all members at every formal gathering.

Slogan

The slogan of the Orden is "Z khrestom i mechem --- za Ukrayinu!" which translates as "With the Cross and the sword, for Ukraine!"

Symbolism

The shield of the Orden is a Crusader Knight, with a sword and a shield of a cross that is reminiscent of the shield of the Knights Hospitaller.

At most Orden events, the key accoutrements are a "prapor" (flag standard), as well as a "metch" (sword) is present, along with four "kleynody" that symbolize the Plast slogan of "SKOB"="Syl'no, Krasno, Oberezhno, Bystro" ("Strongly, Beautifully, Carefully, Speedily").

Core principles

The five core principles of the Orden are:

 A Christian Worldview
 Active Patriotism
 Adherence to the Core Plast Values and a chivalrous spirit
 Personal intellectual enrichment
 Active participation in the spiritual revitalization of the world

Wedding ceremony

At weddings of one of their comrades, all members of the kurin' participate in a ritual ("tseremoniyal") that includes:

 Proklamatsiya (proclamation) ... an edict read to all present, announcing, among other facts, that the wife of the member is henceforth admitted as a member of the Orden, with virtually the same privileges.
 Presentatsiya Dariv ... the presentation of gifts, which typically include a bible, a scroll and a sword.
 Aklyamatsiya Molodoho (acclamation of the Groom) ... a celebration of the member, which includes the member being borne atop an OX shield.
 Adoratsiya Molodoyi (the adoration of the Bride) ... each member of the Orden, in order of rank and seniority, is introduced to the bride and dances with the bride, with the finale reserved for the groom.

Activities within Plast

In Plast today, Krestonostsi are actively involved as counselors or in other leadership roles.  These activities include both summer camps and year-long work in the local branches (stanytsi).  This work is at all levels, from senior leadership to working with Scouts directly.

In addition, many Khrestonostsi are dedicated to community work in both Ukrainian and local communities.

Vovkulaky

Vovkulaky is a group of Ukrainian Scouts, members of the Ukrainian Scouting Organization Plast. The Vovkulaky were founded 50 years ago, and currently have over 50 members over four continents.

Vovkulaky is an international organization with members in Ukraine, Canada, the United States, Germany, Australia and England.

History

The beginning of Plast Vovkulaky Brotherhood dates back to 1946-1947. This took place in a Displaced Persons Camp (DPC) in the city of Dillingen, West Germany.  Maksym Kocur, Oleh Mosora, Luka Kostelyna, Bohdan Pewnyj, Borys Pozhar, and Anatol Sobko were the first members-pioneers of this Brotherhood.

In the latter part of 1946, when they were still in UPJu (Boy Scouts), they named their hurtok Vovky (Wolves).  The following year the hurtok’s name was changed to Lisovi Vovky (Forest Wolves). Later Bohdan Pevnyj and Anatol Sobko suggested the name needed to be changed again to something more historic, something that dwells with the Ukrainian past – history.  They suggested the name Vovkulaky.

The official founding date of the Vovkulaky Brotherhood as part of Ulad Starshykh Plastuniv (USP=Elder Scouts) was March 1, 1948.  The first leadership consisted of Maksym Kocur – hurtkovyj, Anatol Sobko – suddya; Borys Pozhar – pysar (scribe).  Other members at that time were: Wasyl Bystrianyk, Luka Kostelyna, Oleh Mosora and Bohdan Pevnyj.

In the summer of 1948, more people arrived at the Dillingen DPCamp from the Bad Werishoffen DPCamp. From the new arrivals, other Plast members were accepted into the Vovkulaky Brotherhood. They were – Lew Bumba, Oleh Weselowskyj, Lubomyr Dumanowskyj and Bohdan Pihut.

Worldwide

During the winter and spring of 1949 many of the members of the Brotherhood emigrated overseas.  Most of the members emigrated to the United States, two to Argentina. The members kept in touch with individual correspondence as well as with an official newsletter Vovkulachi Visti.

The first Samostijnyj Hurtok USP-iv Vovkulak (Independent Patrol Vovkulak Elder Scouts) was organized and ratified by Plast leadership in the summer of 1949 in Western Germany – in fact in Dillingen. At that time they elected as their leaders Bohdan Pewnyj – hurtkovyj, Anatol Sobko – assistant, and Bohdan Pihut – pysar.

Between 1949 and 1951 many members, after arriving in the USA, left Plast.  Because of this decision, they could no longer remain as members of the Vovlulak Brotherhood.  At this time the Brotherhood, like the Plast Organization, became an international unit – in West Germany, United States and Argentina. In 1952, Anatol Sobko and Bohdan Pihut were in charge in the United States. In Argentina new members were recruited by Borys Pozhar and Lubomyr Dumanoskyj.

Members of The Vovkulaky Brotherhood were constantly under internal organizational (from Plast leadership) and external (from Ukrainian political groups) pressure for their political views as to the future of Ukraine which was occupied by the Soviet Union at that time.

1950s

In the summer of 1952, Plast members gathered near Knox, Indiana for their Okruzhna (Regional) Juvilejna Zustrich (OJuZ) to commemorate the 40th anniversary of its founding. Here at this Zustrich, the Vovkulaky Brotherhood renewed its existence with new members from Chicago and a new leadership was elected: Anatolo Sobko – hurtkovyj and Bohdan Pihut and Oleh Bilynskyj. New members were also accepted namely: Wasyl Fylynovych, Bohdan Kutko, Jurij Ruchtyckyj, Oleksander Ronchkowskyj and Ostap Shenkiryk.

As a Brotherhood, all the members were active in the local Chicago Stanytsia. Some were counselors for the novaky and for the junaky . Twice they went camping for two weeks to the shores of Lake Superior in Upper Michigan. In 1955 the leadership of the Brotherhood was in the hands of Wasyl Fylynowych who was very instrumental in the expansion and renewal of our Brotherhood from a hurtok to a kurin as we are known today.

During the summer of 1955 young Plast members from Chicago, Toronto and Montreal were preparing to travel to Winnipeg, Manitoba - Canada to attend the Krajova Plastova Zustrich. Each hurtok decided to make the journey by different means of transportation. Three members of hurtok Oleni from Chicago took the Greyhound Bus. Three members of hurtok Vovky were more daring and “thumbed” themselves all the way to the destination. Six members of hurtok Gotur from Toronto decided to travel more comfortably. They went with the rest of their Stanytsia – by train.

At the Krajova Zustrich, the three stated hurtky met and camped in their tents next to each other. They were all of the same age 15–16 years old and had the same and common interests. During this Zustrich they participated in various competitive events/games. The three hurtky always shared the three winning places. This fair rivalry and competition brought them closer together.

At one of the Zustrich formation, someone from Toronto or Montreal noticed a particular badge on the uniform of one of the Starshyj Plastun. His name was Wayl Felynowych – from Minneapolis, Minnesota. The boys asked him about the meaning and symbolism on that particular badge. This was the badge of the Vovkulaky hurtok of Starshykh Plastuniv.

Right after the Zustrich, all of us participated in a two-week-long camp. Again we were competing with each other during this camp.

Returning home we kept in touch – mostly by correspondence and by telephone. Our main topic of interest was to which kurin’ of Starshi Plastuny should we apply as a group.

In 1957 Plast leadership decided to celebrate the 45th Anniversary of Plast at a Mizhkrayova Plastova Juvilejna Zustrich near Grafton, Ontario – just east of Toronto.  That summer the Chicago Plast kurin junakiv went camping for three weeks to that particular location of the Zustrich. A week later the Toronto Plast kurin junakiv started their own camp on the premises close to the camp of the Chicagoans. Again there was a great and clean, honest rivalry and competition between the two camps. The leadership of these two camps was in the hands of the junaky that two years earlier met near Winnipeg. It was during this camp and the Zustrich that a decision was made not to join an already existing kurin of Starshi Plastuny but to initiate and organize a brand new kurin that would be called Vovkulaky. The badge would be the one that we saw in Winnipeg two years earlier and the traditions of the Vovlulaky would be the ones explained to us by Wasyl Fylynowych.

By June 1958 all the members of the three hurtky became members of Starshi Plastuny. During the first week-end of September at a Zustrich of Starshi Plastuny at Novyj Sokil, sixteen members from Chicago, Toronto, and Montreal officially renewed the Vovkulaky Brotherhood. There they voted and chose as oboznyj Ivan S. Gula and Slawomyr M. Pihut as his assistant and a scribe.

Organizational structure

All Vovkulaky belong to the Kish of Vovkulaky, whose leader (Kurinnyy) is the Eternal Spirit of Otaman Ivan Sirko (see below).  The Kish contains two Kurins, one with members aged 18–30, and the other having members aged 31 and up.  The leadership (equivalent to a board of executives) of each Kurin is called the Kurin Bulava, composed of the leader ("obozny"), his deputy and judge ("suddya"), the treasurer ("skarbnyk") and scribe ("pysar").  Each Kurin elects its own Bulava at the yearly Minor Assembly (Mala Rada), and confirmed at the yearly Grand Assembly (Velyka Rada).

Kurins are subdivided into chapters, ("plemya"), with each large city hosting a plemya. Vovkulaky who live outside major cities can choose which plemya they want to join, depending on which city they visit most frequently. Plemya are led by a "pleminny", who is elected at an annual plemya assembly.

Another functional position held in each kurin's bulava is that of an executive officer ("usaul"), who has been mandated to fulfill a specific project.

The Vovkulaky Kish has another level of leadership, the Elders ("Didy"), similar to a board of directors.  All Elders make up the Circle of Elders ("Kolo Didiv").  The Circle of Elders comprises the lower-level Elders called Sorcerers ("Did Vidmach") and the higher-level Wizzards ("Did Kharakternyk").  The Circle of Elders is the guardian of Kurin traditions, wisdom and secrets, and has a veto vote at any Assembly.  The Circle of Elders can also dissolve the Kurin's leadership and call a new election at a Grand Assembly.

Membership in the Vovkulaky kurin is acquired in three stages, each with its own title.  The first stage is that of a candidate ("tuluk"), with no obligations nor responsibilities.  At the first Mala Rada, a "tuluk" can request to become an apprentice ("dzhura").  If accepted, he is allowed to wear some specific kurin heraldry and acquires some responsibilities and privileges.  After at least one year, a "dzhura" can request full membership in the kurin.  This promotion is only considered at the Grand Assembly.  Full members obtain specific heraldry, including a badge, a wolf' tail (to be worn on the left side of the hat) and scarf.

The greeting call of the Vovkulaky is "Hav-hu", answered with "Pu-hu".  The motto of the Vovkulaky is "One for all and all for one". The patron and leader of the kurin is the Zaporizhian Otaman Ivan Sirko.

External links
 Orden Khrestonostsiv U.S. home page
 Order of the Iron Spur site
 Vovkulaky site
 Web-site of fraternity Lisovi Chorty
 Official site of Plast (in Ukrainian)
 Plast portal

Youth organizations established in 1946
Scouting and Guiding in Ukraine
Ukrainian diaspora organizations
Ukrainian diaspora in Australia
Fraternities and sororities in Ukraine